Farkhadbek Ravshanuly Irismetov ( (Farhadbek Ravşanūly Irısmetov),  (Farhodbek Ravshan Oʻgʻli Irismetov); born 10 August 1981) is a Kazakhstani football coach and a former defender of Uzbekistani roots. He is an assistant coach with Turan.

Career

Club
Irismetov joined FC Tobol on loan for the second half of the 2014 season.

International
Irismetov has made 34 appearances for the Kazakhstan national football team.

References

External links

Living people
1981 births
People from Shymkent
Kazakhstani footballers
Association football defenders
Kazakhstan international footballers
Kazakhstan Premier League players
Kazakhstan First Division players
FC Torpedo-2 players
FC Kairat players
FC Irtysh Pavlodar players
FC Tobol players
FC Caspiy players
FC Kaisar players
FC Ordabasy players
FC Altai Semey players
Kazakhstani football managers